Mariano Dias is a former Indian footballer who is currently the head coach for Churchill Brothers S.C. in the I-League.

Playing career
Dias started his footballing career in 1981 for Salgaocar S.C. and stayed till 1989 when he moved to MRF FC. He stayed at MRF till 1993 and he signed with Churchill Brothers. He stayed at Churchill Brothers till he retired one year later in 1994.

Coaching career
Dias started coaching the India U14 football team in 2007 during the 2007 AFC U14 Festival. He stayed with India U14 for one year. In 2008 Dias signed with SESA Football Academy. He coached SESA during the 2009 I-League 2nd Division in which SESA failed to gain promotion. Dias then signed with the Goa Football Association to coach the Goa football team during the 2009 Santosh Trophy tournament which Goa Won after a long time. Later for the 2010 Santosh Trophy. The team managed to reach the semi-finals where the club lost 3–4 on penalties to West Bengal. After coaching Goa, Dias signed with former club as a player, Salgaocar, to become the Senior Director of Football. On 25 November 2011 it was announced that Dias had been appointed as assistant manager of the India national football team.

Churchill Brothers
On 13 July 2012 it was announced that Dias had been signed by the Churchill Brothers to become their new head coach. He was instrumental in Churchill brothers winning the I league for 2013 as head Coach. In 2014 Mariano Dias single-handedly coached Churchill brothers to their first Federation Cup Win. Mariano was again in the limelight when he managed to assist Churchill Brothers Team to survive relegation from the I-League in the last 3 matches. https://lynxsolution.com/goalfest/2014/04/bhowmick-sacked-by-churchill-bros-mariano-dias/. He also revived the club in the Asian Football Confederation's (AFC) Cup, Asian football second tier club competition.http://www.goal.com/en-india/news/136/india/2014/05/06/4798492/churchill-look-to-establish-new-order. https://web.archive.org/web/20140506163447/http://www.the-afc.com/en/afc-cup-all-news/28271-afc-cup-md6-new-radiant-1-2-churchill-brothers.html

Career statistics

Club
Statistics accurate as of 17 February 2013

Honours

Manager

Churchill Brothers
I-League: 2012–13
Federation Cup: 2013–14

References

Indian footballers

Living people
I-League players
I-League managers
Churchill Brothers FC Goa managers
Association footballers not categorized by position
Indian football managers
Footballers from Goa
1960 births